Titannus is a fictional character appearing in American comic books published by Marvel Comics.

Publication history
Titannus first appeared in Marvel Team-Up Vol. 3 #2 and was created by Robert Kirkman and Scott Kolins.

Fictional character biography
Originally, Titannus was a Skrull who, lacking shape-shifting abilities, became one of the subjects of the Super-Skrull project, giving him enhanced strength and a healing factor that would allow him to recover from any wound. Leaving his world, he eventually arrived on the planet Trellion, where he was brainwashed by the inhabitants to act as their agent. Believing that he was fleeing an oppressive ruler, he escaped with the woman he loved (against her will) and traveled to planet Earth in an attempt to seek the aid of the heroes so they could revolt against Trellion.

His spacecraft crash landing in Japan, Titannus observed the heroes of Earth for several months and attempted to 'gain their attention' by destroying Tokyo, defeating the premier superhero of Japan Sunfire and killing countless soldiers of the Japanese army.

Sensing the disturbance, Doctor Strange assembled a new team of Defenders to oppose the alien, consisting of Spider-Man, She-Hulk, Ms. Marvel and Nova, seeking out the Incredible Hulk out of a need for his strength, the team as a whole meeting Wolverine in Tokyo where he was already attempting to fight Titannus. Titannus attempted to win them over to his side by recounting the story he had been brainwashed with and claiming that he had merely lost his temper when attacked by Sunfire, but Doctor Strange sensed little truth in Titannus' words, and Spider-Man stated that they did not help someone who blew up a city just because he had a tragic story to tell them. Despite their best efforts, however, the gathered heroes were unable to stop Titannus, who displayed enough power to defeat even the Hulk with ease by absorbing the gamma radiation that powered the behemoth, as well as breaking She-Hulk's left arm. When Titannus' beloved was woken up by Strange and Nova, the truth was revealed and Titannus, having been so dependent on his love for her, was driven to suicide by her rejection—apparently killing himself by crushing his own head. Spider-Man later speculated that she had been angry at the failure of her peoples' plan to attack Earth's heroes.

However, his healing factor was so advanced that it allowed him to grow a new head, although he appeared to suffer from total amnesia, possibly because of his development of a completely new brain. Later, some insane scientists from Tokyo took control over Titannus and ordered him to attack the United States, believing that Titannus had been part of a US attempt to conquer Japan. Again some superheroes (consisting of Doctor Strange, Spider-Man, Ms Marvel, She-Hulk, Wolverine, Luke Cage and Captain America) had to assemble to subdue the monster. Titannus was defeated and taken in by S.H.I.E.L.D., thanks to the new arrival of new hero Crusader, who distracted him by creating an illusionary reality where he'd killed all of his opponents while Doctor Strange found the location of the people who controlled him, modifying their technology to keep Titannus dormant.

Powers and abilities
As a result of the Super-Skrull project, Titannus acquired superhuman strength and stamina, flight, invulnerability, a healing factor, and the ability to project energy blasts.

Other versions

Earth-5012
In a reality where the Avengers never disbanded, the Vision detected Titannus' ship upon its arrival. After making contact with Titannus, the Avengers came with him to Trellion, sympathising with him because of his 'false' story, only to be attacked by Titannus and the natives of the planet upon their arrival. Wasp was killed instantly, Hank Pym (apparently another Hulk in this timeline) was announced missing in action, and Captain America was executed to break the spirits of the remaining Avengers. It took five years for the reserve Avengers to rescue the team, and another five before the Trellions were convinced to leave Earth alone. In this world, Reed Richards presumably made an unknown fatal mistake that led to the deaths of many, and the Iron Man of this timeline took on the familiar trappings of Doctor Doom to oppose Richards. During the first story arc of the third Marvel Team-Up series, this twisted version of Tony Stark has come to Earth-616, the primary Earth of the Marvel Universe, and now goes by the name of Iron Maniac.

In other media
Titannus appears as a boss in the video game Marvel: Ultimate Alliance voiced by David Sobolov. The heroes meet Titannus while attempting to save the Skrull world from Galactus. He tries to kill the Skrull scientists for forcing him to join the Super-Skrull program. He is defeated by the heroes.

References

External links
 Titannus at Marvel.com
 Titannus at Marvel Wiki
 Titannus at Comic Vine

Characters created by Robert Kirkman
Fictional mass murderers
Marvel Comics characters with accelerated healing
Marvel Comics characters with superhuman strength
Marvel Comics extraterrestrial supervillains
Comics characters introduced in 2005
Marvel Comics supervillains
Skrull